COMCOM may refer to:
 Communicative competence
 Commerce Commission, New Zealand government agency
 Federal Communications Commission of the Swiss Federal Department of Environment, Transport, Energy and Communications
 Communauté de communes, in France

See also 
 COMCO (disambiguation)